Ophryophryne microstoma is a species of frog in the family Megophryidae. It is found in Cambodia, China, Laos, Thailand, and Vietnam.
Its natural habitats are subtropical or tropical moist lowland forests, subtropical or tropical moist montane forests, rivers, and swamps. It is threatened by habitat loss.

References 

microstoma
Amphibians of Cambodia
Amphibians of China
Amphibians of Laos
Amphibians of Thailand
Amphibians of Vietnam
Taxonomy articles created by Polbot
Amphibians described in 1903
Taxobox binomials not recognized by IUCN